In mathematics, specifically algebraic topology, the mapping cylinder of a continuous function  between topological spaces  and  is the quotient

where the  denotes the disjoint union, and ∼ is the equivalence relation generated by

That is, one writes 

with the subscripted cup symbol denoting the equivalence. The mapping cylinder is commonly used to construct the mapping cone , obtained by collapsing one end of the cylinder to a point. Mapping cylinders are central to the definition of cofibrations.

Basic properties
The projection  splits (via ), and the deformation retraction  is given by:

(where points in  stay fixed because  for all ).

An explicit formula for the strong deformation retraction can be worked out.

Examples

Mapping cylinder of a fiber bundle 
For a fiber bundle  with fiber , the mapping cylinder

has the equivalence relation

Then, there is a canonical map sending a point
 to the point , giving a fiber bundle

whose fiber is the cone . To see this, notice the fiber over a point  is the quotient space

Interpretation
The mapping cylinder may be viewed as a way to replace an arbitrary map by an equivalent cofibration, in the following sense:

Given a map , the mapping cylinder is a space , together with a cofibration  and a surjective homotopy equivalence  (indeed, Y is a deformation retract of ), such that the composition  equals f.

Thus the space Y gets replaced with a homotopy equivalent space , and the map f with a lifted map . Equivalently, the diagram

gets replaced with a diagram

together with a homotopy equivalence between them.

The construction serves to replace any map of topological spaces by a homotopy equivalent cofibration.

Note that pointwise, a cofibration is a closed inclusion.

Applications
Mapping cylinders are quite common homotopical tools. One use of mapping cylinders is to apply theorems concerning inclusions of spaces to general maps, which might not be injective.

Categorical application and interpretation
One can use the mapping cylinder to construct homotopy colimits: this follows from the general statement that any category with all pushouts and coequalizers has all colimits.  That is, given a diagram, replace the maps by cofibrations (using the mapping cylinder) and then take the ordinary pointwise limit (one must take a bit more care, but mapping cylinders are a component).

Mapping telescope
Given a sequence of maps

the mapping telescope is the homotopical direct limit. If the maps are all already cofibrations (such as for the orthogonal groups ), then the direct limit is the union, but in general one must use the mapping telescope. The mapping telescope is a sequence of mapping cylinders, joined end-to-end. The picture of the construction looks like a stack of increasingly large cylinders, like a telescope.

Formally, one defines it as

See also
 Cofibration
Mapping cylinder (homological algebra)
 Homotopy colimit
 Mapping path space, which can be viewed as the mapping cocylinder

References 

 

Algebraic topology